Before We Ruled the Earth is a two-part documentary television miniseries that premiered on February 9, 2003 on the Discovery Channel. The program featured early human history and the challenges human beings faced thousands of years ago. The first episode was called "Hunt or Be Hunted" and the second called "Mastering the Beasts."

Episodes

Episode 1
"Hunt or Be Hunted" (narrated by Linda Hunt). The first part in the series shows how humans started out as prey for other animals such as saber-toothed cats. It depicts a saber-toothed cat killing an antelope and leaving the remains of the carcass; our ancestors attempt to steal the remains from the cat and one of the group is killed as the saber tooth spots them. It also shows how we discovered tools and made use of the sharpened stone. Later the show showed how as we grew more intelligent, that we were able to turn the tables on the beasts.

Episode 2
"Mastering the Beasts" (narrated by John Slattery). The second and last part in the series takes place during the Ice Age. It shows how the Cro-Magnon and modern humans have become the dominant species and how we hunted animals such as mammoths, aurochs and buffalo. Threats however include giant cave bears and wolves. Death on the tundra was common and to survive our ancestors need to be able to adapt to change, such as the warming of the earth at the end of the last Ice Age ... something most of the giant beasts could not do, and therefore suffered extinction.

References

External links
On allmovie.com

2003 American television series debuts
2000s American documentary television series
Discovery Channel original programming
Documentary films about prehistoric life